George Byng Scott (1824 – 17 February 1886) was an English-born Australian public servant, who served as Government Resident of the Northern Territory between 1873 and 1876.

Career
Born in Gillingham, Kent, England in 1824, Scott moved to South Australia in 1846, initially working as a farmer near Morgan. After a further four years as a gold miner, first in California, United States and then in Bendigo, Victoria, Scott became the Inspector of Police for the South-Eastern District of South Australia. At the same time, he served as a stipendiary magistrate. In 1859, he moved to be a magistrate in Naracoorte.

From 6 October 1873 until 30 June 1876, Scott served as Government Resident of the Northern Territory. After his period in office, he returned to working as a stipendiary magistrate, first in Adelaide and then Mount Gambier. He continued in this latter role until his death on 17 February 1886.

Personal life
Scott married twice and had 9 children. His first marriage was to Elizabeth née Taylor on 7 October 1843, with whom he had 2 children. Elizabeth died in November 1849. Scott remarried in July 1865, to Caroline née Ritchie. They had 7 children.

Memorial
Scott Street in the Darwin suburb of Fannie Bay is named in his honour.

References

1824 births
1886 deaths
Government Resident of the Northern Territory
People of the California Gold Rush
People from Gillingham, Kent
English emigrants to Australia